James or Jim Abbott may refer to:

James Abbott (Indian Army officer) (1807–1896), British colonial administrator
James H. Abbott (1851–1914), British philatelist
Jim Abbott (outfielder) (1884–?), American baseball player
James Abbott (footballer) (1892–?), English footballer
Jim Abbott (Canadian politician) (1942–2020), Canadian politician
James W. Abbott (born 1948), American university administrator and politician
Jim Abbott (born 1967), American baseball player
James T. Abbott, American attorney and government official